Nzoia Sugar Football Club (formerly Nzoia United Football Club) is a Kenyan football club based in Bungoma. They currently compete in the Kenyan Premier League, and play their home games at the Sudi Stadium  in Bungoma.

Performance in CAF competitions 
CAF Champions League: 1 appearance
2003 – First Round

References

External links 
 soccervista
 footlive

Kenyan Premier League clubs
Kenyan National Super League clubs
FKF Division One clubs
Football clubs in Kenya
Works association football clubs in Kenya